Agios Stefanos (meaning Saint Stephen) is a northern suburb in Athens, Greece. Since the 2011 local government reform it is part of the municipality of Dionysos, of which it is the seat and a municipal unit. The municipal unit has an area of 8.136 km2.

Geography
Agios Stefanos is situated in the hills in the northeastern part of the Athens conurbation, at about 350 m elevation. It lies east of the Parnitha mountains, northwest of the Penteliko Mountain, and 4 km southwest of the Marathon Reservoir. The source of the river Kifisos is near Agios Stefanos. It is 9 km west of Marathon and 21 km northeast of Athens city centre. Its built-up area is continuous with those of the neighbouring suburbs Anoixi and Stamata to the south.

Motorway 1 (Athens - Lamia - Thessaloniki) passes west of the town. Agios Stefanos has a railway station on the railway from Athens to Thessaloniki. Athens ERA-1 transmitter, the second tallest man-made structure of Greece, is situated north of Agios Stefanos.

Historical population
Agios Stefanos has historically been an Arvanite settlement.

See also
List of municipalities of Attica

References

Populated places in East Attica
Dionysos, Greece
Arvanite settlements